Aminul Haque is a male Muslim given name, meaning "trustee of the truth".
Notable bearers of the name include:

 Aminul Haque (actor) (1921–2011), Bangladeshi film actor
 Aminul Haque (Attorney General) (1931–1995), Bangladeshi lawyer and Attorney General
 Sikdar Aminul Haq (1942–2003), Bangladeshi poet
 Aminul Haque (politician) (1942/1943–2019), Bangladeshi politician and minister
 Aminul Huq Moni (1949–2015), Bangladeshi sports organiser
 Aminul Haque Laskar (born 1966), Indian politician from Assam
 Aminul Hoque (writer) (born 1970s), Bangladeshi-born British writer
 AKM Aminul Haque, Bangladeshi marine biologist and academic
 Md Aminul Haque Bhuyan, Bangladeshi academic and Vice-chancellor 
 Aminul Haque (footballer) (born 1980), Bangladeshi football player
 Syed Aminul Haque, Pakistani politician

Arabic masculine given names